Oust-Marest is a commune in the Somme département in Hauts-de-France in northern France.

Geography

Population

History
The name of Oust-Marest comes from Roman origins. Possibly from a settlement named in honour of Augusta. Archaeologists have found traces of a Gallo-Roman amphitheatre and a temple in the locality.

Places of interest
 A watermill on the river Bresle

See also
Communes of the Somme department

References

Communes of Somme (department)